"Hey Lover" is a song by American rapper LL Cool J, released as the first single from his sixth album, Mr. Smith (1995). The song features vocals from American R&B group Boyz II Men. It was released on October 31, 1995, for Def Jam Recordings and was produced by The Trackmasters and LL Cool J. The song samples Michael Jackson's "The Lady in My Life" from his 1982 hit album Thriller; thus Rod Temperton, the writer of that song, was given credit as a writer of this song. On the B-side is the "I Shot Ya" remix.

"Hey Lover" would prove to be the most successful single from the album, making it to number three on both the US Billboard Hot 100 and Hot R&B Singles charts. It sold 900,000 copies in 1995 and was certified platinum by the Recording Industry Association of America in January 1996 for selling one million copies. It also reached number 17 on the UK Singles Chart, number six in Sweden, and number five in New Zealand.

At the 1997 Grammy Awards, the song won a Grammy Award for Best Rap Solo Performance, becoming his second Grammy in that category after 1992's "Mama Said Knock You Out". The music video was directed by Hype Williams and featured television and film actress Gillian Iliana Waters as LL Cool J's love interest.

Critical reception
Gil L. Robertson IV from Cash Box wrote, "What can I say? It’s a definite number one single. After a short hiatus from the music industry to embark upon a promising film and television career, LL is back with an R&B based track which teams him with super-quartet Boyz II Men. Can you remember what 'I Need Love', did for the rap culture as a whole? Prior to that single’s success a slow jam rap single was unheard of, yet LL pulled it off with a smooth style that was undeniable. This track brings to mind long days of hanging out at the malls, chasing girls. Thanks, LL, for the smooth reminiscence."

Track listings
All versions of "Hey Lover" feature Boyz II Men, and all versions of "I Shot Ya" feature Prodigy, Keith Murray, Fat Joe, and Foxy Brown.

 US and Australian cassette single
 "Hey Lover" (radio edit)
 "Hey Lover" (instrumental)

 US 12-inch single
A1. "Hey Lover" (radio edit)
A2. "Hey Lover" (instrumental)
B1. "Hey Lover" (LP version)
B2. "Hey Lover" (a cappella)

 French CD single
 "Hey Lover" (radio edit)
 "I Shot Ya" (remix)

 UK and European CD single
 "Hey Lover" (radio edit)
 "Hey Lover" (instrumental)
 "I Shot Ya" (remix)
 "I Shot Ya" (LP version)

 Australasian CD single
 "Hey Lover" (radio edit)
 "Hey Lover" (instrumental)
 "I Shot Ya" (remix)
 "Hey Lover" (LP version)

Charts

Weekly charts

Year-end charts

Certifications

Release history

See also
 List of Billboard number-one rap singles of the 1980s and 1990s

References

1990s ballads
1995 singles
1995 songs
Boyz II Men songs
Contemporary R&B ballads
Def Jam Recordings singles
Grammy Award for Best Rap Solo Performance
Island Records singles
LL Cool J songs
Music videos directed by Hype Williams
Song recordings produced by Trackmasters
Songs about loneliness
Songs written by LL Cool J
Songs written by Rod Temperton